Lecanora mellea is a species of crustose lichen in the family Lecanoraceae. Found in North America, it was described as new to science in 1975.

See also
List of Lecanora species

References

mellea
Lichen species
Lichens described in 1975
Lichens of North America
Taxa named by William Alfred Weber